The Canal de Savières is a canal in eastern France. It joins the Lac du Bourget to the Rhône at Chanaz. It was a natural watercourse until canalised in the 19th century.

See also
List of canals in France

References

Savieres
Canals opened in 1985
CSavieres